The surname Blocher or Blöcher may refer to:

Christoph Blocher, a Swiss politician and industrialist
Henri Blocher, a French evangelical theologian
Stefan Blöcher, a former field hockey player
William Durbin Blocher, commander of Blocher's Battery in American Civil War

Occupational surnames
German-language surnames